Dmitry Fomin or Dmitri Fomine (born 21 January 1968) is a former Russian male volleyball player.  He was part of the Soviet Union men's national volleyball team at the 1990 FIVB Volleyball Men's World Championship and was later part of the Russia men's national volleyball team at the 1996 Summer Olympics. Fomin won MVP Award in World League 1995 and World Cup 1991.

References

External links
 
 
 

1968 births
Living people
Russian men's volleyball players
Soviet men's volleyball players
Place of birth missing (living people)
Volleyball players at the 1992 Summer Olympics
Volleyball players at the 1996 Summer Olympics
Olympic volleyball players of Russia
Olympic volleyball players of the Unified Team